The following highways are numbered 31A:

Canada
 British Columbia Highway 31A

India
  National Highway 31A (India)

United States
 U.S. Route 31A
 Nebraska Spur 31A
 New Jersey Route 31A (former)
 New York State Route 31A
 Oklahoma State Highway 31A